Sunday Ginikachukwu Nweke,  known professionally as Masterkraft, is a Nigerian record producer, disc jockey, band director, pianist, and songwriter. He started his professional music career with Kennis Music, and has worked with artists such as Flavour N'abania, Bracket, Banky W., Sound Sultan, Timaya, Lynxxx, M.I and J. Martins, among others. His production hits include "Fine lady" by Lynxxx featuring Wizkid, "Kwarikwa (Remix)" by Flavour N'abania featuring Fally Ipupa, "Girl" by Bracket featuring Wizkid, "Chinny Baby" by Flavour N'abania, and "Jasi" by Banky W.

Leadership newspaper ranked him 8th on its 2014 list of the Top 10 Music Producers In Nigeria. In August 2015, Nigeria Entertainment Today ranked him 7th on its list of Nigeria's Top 7 Biggest Music Producers at the Moment. Thisday newspaper listed him as one of its Top 10 Music Producers in Nigeria.

Background
A native of Enugu State, Masterkraft was 
born in Ajegunle, Lagos State. While growing up, he attended United Christian Secondary School in Apapa and dreamt of being an accountant.

Discography

Studio albums

Accolades

References

Living people
Nigerian record producers
Musicians from Lagos State
Nigerian songwriters
Nigerian DJs
Nigerian music industry executives
Year of birth missing (living people)